Narcís Pèlach Nadal (born 5 September 1988) is a Spanish football coach and former player who is the assistant manager of Huddersfield Town.

Career
Born in Girona, Pèlach played for Girona, spending 14 years with the club as a player and coach. He managed their B-team, Peralada. He also managed UE Figueres. He joined the staff of English club Huddersfield Town in 2020. He was appointed interim head coach in September 2022, winning his only game in charge, and again in February 2023.

References

1988 births
Living people
Spanish footballers
Girona FC players
Spanish football managers
Girona FC non-playing staff
UE Figueres managers
Huddersfield Town A.F.C. non-playing staff
Huddersfield Town A.F.C. managers
Spanish expatriate football managers
Spanish expatriates in England
Expatriate football managers in England